Jean David Meneses Villarroel (born 16 March 1993) is a Chilean professional footballer who plays as a winger for Liga MX club Toluca and the Chile national team.

Career
In March 2018, he came to international attention for his blatant dive to win a late penalty, which was converted for a 2–1 victory against rivals Colo-Colo in the Chilean Primera División.

On 1 August 2018, Meneses was loaned out to Club León for the rest of the season. In May 2019, it was confirmed, that Club León had redeemed the player and he would stay at the club.

International
He made his Chile national team debut on 10 September 2019 in a friendly against Honduras. He started the game and was substituted in the 64th minute.

International goals
As of match played 9 September 2021. Scores and results list Chile's goal tally first.

Honours
León
 Liga MX: Guardianes 2020
 Leagues Cup: 2021

Citations

External links
 
 
 

1993 births
Living people
Chilean footballers
Chilean expatriate footballers
Chile international footballers
San Luis de Quillota footballers
Universidad de Concepción footballers
Club León footballers
Chilean Primera División players
Primera B de Chile players
Liga MX players
2021 Copa América players
Expatriate footballers in Mexico
Chilean expatriate sportspeople in Mexico
Association football wingers
People from Quillota